The Crucible is an album by John Zorn. It is the fourth album to feature the "Moonchild Trio" of Mike Patton, Joey Baron and Trevor Dunn, following Moonchild: Songs Without Words (2005), Astronome (2006) and Six Litanies for Heliogabalus (2007). It also features Marc Ribot on guitar and Zorn on alto saxophone.

Reception

Allmusic called it "a mad mélange of modern classical music, doom-laden metal, power chord-driven rock, and freely improvised jazz." All About Jazz reviewer Mark Corroto noted "The exchanges are crisp and the musicianship (no surprise here) is top rate. The band displays a gentle beauty in the excess that is this music." Consequence of Sound stated "No matter how far Zorn experiments out into the ether, he always keeps grounded in the same place. And that place is always breathtaking, full of weird wonderment, amazing power and lithe musicianship."

Track listing 
All compositions by John Zorn
 "Almadel" – 7:10  
 "Shapeshifting" – 3:19 
 "Maleficia" – 8:13  
 "9x9" – 5:37
 "Hobgoblin" – 2:54  
 "Incubi" – 7:44  
 "Witchfinder" – 3:44  
 "The Initiate" – 5:41

Personnel 
 Mike Patton – voice
 John Zorn – alto saxophone 
 Trevor Dunn – bass 
 Joey Baron – drums 
 Marc Ribot – guitar (track 4)

References 

2008 albums
Moonchild albums
Albums produced by John Zorn
Tzadik Records albums